Martin Baron (born 25 July 1987) is a French football 5-a-side player who competes at international football competitions. He is a Paralympic silver medalist, IBSA World Games silver medalist and a two-time European champion. He was born blind and plays as striker for Cécifoot since 2005.

References

External links
 
 

1987 births
Living people
People from Chambray-lès-Tours
French footballers
Paralympic 5-a-side footballers of France
5-a-side footballers at the 2012 Summer Paralympics
5-a-side footballers at the 2020 Summer Paralympics
Medalists at the 2012 Summer Paralympics
Footballers from Centre-Val de Loire
Sportspeople from Indre-et-Loire
French blind people